The 1948 United States presidential election in Mississippi took place on November 2, 1948, in Mississippi as part of the wider United States presidential election of 1948.

The Democratic Party candidate, South Carolina governor Strom Thurmond, overwhelmingly won Mississippi against fellow Democrat, incumbent President Harry S. Truman by a margin of 148,154 votes, or 77.08%. Although Truman was the national Democratic Party candidate, Thurmond managed to be placed on the ballot in Mississippi, South Carolina, Louisiana, and Alabama as the official "Democratic" candidate. Outside of these four states, Thurmond was forced to run under the label of the States' Rights Democratic Party. The Republican Party candidate, New York governor Thomas E. Dewey, had no impact on the race in Mississippi, only obtaining 5,043 votes total, or 2.62% of the popular vote, and failing to attract even 10% of the vote in any Mississippi county.

Background
Mississippi in this era was a one-party state dominated by the Democratic Party, so that the only competitive contests were Democratic primaries that were by law excluded to non-whites until the landmark court case of Smith v. Allwright. Ever since seeing the potential effect on the United States' image abroad (and ability to win the Cold War against the radically egalitarian rhetoric of Communism) of the beating and blinding of Isaac Woodard three hours after being discharged from the army, President Truman was attempting to launch a Civil Rights bill, involving desegregation of the military. Southern Democrats immediately made such cries as "unconstitutional", "Communist inspired," "a blow to the loyal South and its traditions," "unwarranted and harmful," "not the answer," and "does irreparable harm to interracial relations".

Southern Democrats walked out at the party's national convention in Philadelphia because of Truman's endorsement of civil rights for African Americans, and Mississippi, the state with the highest proportion of blacks in its population, was alongside neighbouring Alabama the most opposed to Truman. Indeed, whereas only half of Alabama's delegation walked out, all of Mississippi's did.

This segregationist faction met on July 17, 1948, in Birmingham, Alabama, nominating South Carolina governor Strom Thurmond as its nominee for president. Mississippi governor Fielding L. Wright was nominated for vice president. Mississippi pledged its Democratic electors to Thurmond on August 3 without debate, and although a group of nine students from Mississippi State College qualified as Truman/Barkley electors after that ticket had sought to find electors from University of Mississippi students, all the nine nominated Truman electors personally supported the Dixiecrats rather than the national party.

Vote
Thurmond carried all of Mississippi's 82 counties, forty-seven with over ninety percent of the vote and seventy with over eighty percent, and Truman only managed to break forty percent in one county, while Dewey was held to less than ten percent in every county. The "weakest" region for Thurmond came from the northeastern corner where he failed to break sixty percent in four counties. These northeastern counties are the least fertile in the state and were (and remain) populated by the smallest proportion of African Americans. They were also - within the one-party Democratic primary system - always opposed to the free-market business and landowning interests, who were Thurmond's chief support base. Consequently, whites in the far northeast of Mississippi – even those with enough money to pay the poll tax – supported the public works, minimum wage laws, and working hour laws of President Truman's "Fair Deal" which were strongly opposed by Black Belt landowners. In these northeastern hill counties preoccupations with race were also less overwhelming.

Thurmond's vote constitutes the highest ever statewide vote percentage for a candidate who was not a national major party nominee.

Results

Results by county

Notes

References

Mississippi
1948 Mississippi elections
1948